Shane Joseph (born July 23, 1981 in Brooks, Alberta) is a former Canadian professional ice hockey winger. He most recently played for the Iserlohn Roosters in the Deutsche Eishockey Liga.

Playing career
Joseph began his hockey career in 1999 in the Western Collegiate Hockey Association and played for Minnesota State University, at Mankato. After an injury his freshman year he was given a redshirt status so he was still eligible for four more years.  In the 2002–03 and 2003–04 seasons Joseph scored the most goals, assists, and points for the Mavericks, while earning an All-American award for the season 2002-03.   After graduating, Joseph signed an amateur try-out contract with the Cleveland Barons of the American Hockey League, the former affiliate of the San Jose Sharks, for the 2003–04 season. He helped the Barons reach the semifinals of the divisional playoffs for the Calder Cup. On June 27, 2004, Joseph signed his first professional contract with the San Jose Sharks of the National Hockey League. He was later reassigned back to the Barons, so Joseph never got the chance to prove himself in the NHL.

He then joined the Augsburger Panther of the Deutsche Eishockey Liga for the 2006–07 season.  After consistent performances Joseph was selected for the 2007 DEL All-Star Game. He finished his first European season as top scorer of the Panthers. After another year in Augsburg, Joseph finished as top scorer again, Joseph was signed by the management of the DEG Metro Stars for the 2008–09, 09-10 seasons.

With DEG, he helped the Stars to runner-up after being defeated in the 2009 finals to Eisbären Berlin. After completing his second season with DEG in 2009–10, his contract was not renewed. On May 10, 2010, Joseph signed a one-year contract with the Iserlohn Roosters.

In the 2010–11 season, Joseph placed third among the Roosters scoring with 37 points in 52 games. After failing to help Iserlohn reach the playoffs, Joseph was not tendered another contract.

Career statistics

Awards and honours

References

External links

1981 births
Augsburger Panther players
Canadian ice hockey forwards
Cleveland Barons (2001–2006) players
DEG Metro Stars players
Ice hockey people from Alberta
Iserlohn Roosters players
Living people
Minnesota State Mavericks men's ice hockey players
People from Brooks, Alberta
Canadian expatriate ice hockey players in Germany
AHCA Division I men's ice hockey All-Americans

Minnesota State University, Mankato alumni